Shahin Chakladar is a Bangladesh Awami League politician  and the incumbent Jatiya Sangsad member representing the Jessore-6 constituency winning the July 2020 by-election.

Career 
Chaklader was accuse in an extortion case along with Sheikh Helal. He was acquitted in the case while Sheikh Helal was found guilty in 2008.

Chakladar has been the general secretary of Jessore district Awami League since 2004. He was the chairman of Jessore Sadar Upazila Parishad from 2009 to 2020. After the death of Ismat Ara Sadeq, Member of Parliament and former Minister of State for Public Administration on 21 January 2020, he was elected member of parliament in the by-election of Jessore-6 vacant seat on the nomination of Awami League on 14 July 2020.

Chaklader has been accused of using his political ties to engage in corruption. He owns Zabeer Hotel International in Jessore which he established 300 million taka investment.

References 

Living people
Awami League politicians
11th Jatiya Sangsad members
Year of birth missing (living people)
Place of birth missing (living people)